Slavoljub Janković (Serbian Cyrillic: Славољуб Јанковић;  born 17 February 1969) is a former Serbian footballer who played as a defender.

Career
He played in the juvenile ranks of Red Star Belgrade and featured the Yugoslavia national under-20 football team that won the title at the 1987 FIFA World Youth Championship. Although he became league champions with Red Star in 1990 Janković didn't become a regular in the team and had spells with Napredak, Budućnost and OFK Belgrade where his career didn't prosper with the start of the Yugoslav Wars. Later on he played in Greece.

He started his coaching at Jedinstvo and later on with SFS Borac. In August 2009 Janković was appointed manager at Radnički Niš and in July 2011 at FK Juhor Obrež.

References

External links

1969 births
Living people
Serbian footballers
Yugoslav footballers
Association football defenders
Yugoslav First League players
First Professional Football League (Bulgaria) players
Red Star Belgrade footballers
FK Napredak Kruševac players
FK Budućnost Podgorica players
OFK Beograd players
PFC Lokomotiv Plovdiv players
Serbian expatriate footballers
Expatriate footballers in Bulgaria
Serbian football managers